The Traitor's Gate is a 1927 crime novel by the British writer Edgar Wallace. It concerns a plot by a criminal mastermind to steal the Crown Jewels from the Tower of London.

Adaptations
It has been adapted into film twice:
The Yellow Mask, a 1930 British film directed by Harry Lachman
 Traitor's Gate, a 1964 British-German film directed by Freddie Francis

References

Bibliography
 Goble, Alan. The Complete Index to Literary Sources in Film. Walter de Gruyter, 1999.

External links
 Full text of The Traitor's Gate at Project Gutenberg Australia

1927 British novels
Novels by Edgar Wallace
British novels adapted into films
Novels set in London
Hodder & Stoughton books
Doubleday, Page & Company books
Tower of London